Kuti is a village in the municipality of Herceg Novi, Montenegro.

Demographics
According to the 2011 census, its population was 729.

References

External links

Populated places in Herceg Novi Municipality